Keegan Daniel Jelacic (born 31 July 2002) is a professional footballer who plays as a midfielder for  Perth Glory.

Personal Life
Jelacic was born in Australia to a Kiwi mother.

International Career
Jelacic is eligible to represent Australia or New Zealand.

He has previously represented New Zealand at youth level. 

On 7 March 2023, he was called up for the Australia U-23 team.

References

External links

2002 births
Living people
New Zealand association footballers
Association football midfielders
Brisbane Strikers FC players
Brisbane Roar FC players
National Premier Leagues players
A-League Men players
New Zealand people of Croatian descent